Latvian Football Cup 2000 was the fifty-ninth season of the Latvian annual football knock-out competition.

Preliminary round

| colspan="3" style="background:#9cc;"|April 8, 2000

|}

First round

| colspan="3" style="background:#9cc;"|April 12, 2000

|}

Quarterfinals

Semifinals

First leg

Second leg

Skonto Riga won 8-1 on aggregate

Liepājas Metalurgs won 10-3 on aggregate

Final

External links
 Latvian Cup on rsssf.com

2000
1999–2000 domestic association football cups
2000–01 domestic association football cups
Cup